The National Collegiate Athletic Association (NCAA) Division I men's basketball tournament is a single-elimination tournament for men's college basketball teams in the United States. It determines the champion of Division I, the top level of play in the NCAA, and the media often describes the winner as the national champion of college basketball. The NCAA Tournament has been held annually since 1939, except for 2020, when it was cancelled because of the COVID-19 pandemic in the U.S. Its field grew from eight teams in the beginning to sixty-five teams by 2001; as of 2011, sixty-eight teams take part in the tournament. Teams can gain invitations by winning a conference championship or receiving an at-large bid from a 10-person committee. The semifinals of the tournament are known as the Final Four and are held in a different city each year, along with the championship game; Indianapolis, the city where the NCAA is based, will host the Final Four every five years until 2040. Each winning university receives a rectangular, gold-plated trophy made of wood.

The first NCAA tournament was organized by the National Association of Basketball Coaches. Oregon won the inaugural tournament, defeating Ohio State 46–33 in the first championship game. Before the 1941 tournament, control of the event was given to the NCAA. In the early years of the tournament, it was considered less important than the National Invitation Tournament (NIT), a New York City-based event. Teams were able to compete in both events in the same year, and three of those that did so—Utah in 1944, Kentucky in 1949, and City College of New York (CCNY) in 1950—won the NCAA Tournament. The 1949–50 CCNY team won both tournaments (defeating Bradley in both finals), and is the only college basketball team to accomplish this feat. By the mid-1950s, the NCAA Tournament became the more prestigious of the two events, and in 1971 the NCAA barred universities from playing in other tournaments, such as the NIT, if they were invited to the NCAA Tournament. The 2013 championship won by Louisville was the first men's basketball national title to ever be vacated by the NCAA after the school and its coach at the time, Rick Pitino, were implicated in a 2015 sex scandal involving recruits.

The University of California, Los Angeles (UCLA) has been the most successful college in the NCAA Tournament, winning 11 national titles. Ten of those championships came during a 12-year stretch from 1964 to 1975. UCLA also holds the record for the most consecutive championships, winning seven in a row from 1967 to 1973. Kentucky has the second-most titles, with eight. North Carolina is third with six championships, while Duke, and Indiana follow with five each. Kansas is the most recent champion, having defeated North Carolina in the final of the 2022 tournament. Among head coaches, John Wooden is the all-time leader with 10 championships; he coached UCLA during their period of success in the 1960s and 1970s. Duke's Mike Krzyzewski is second all-time with five titles.

Championship games

Multiple champions

Champions by conference status

Champions by conference at the time of tournaments

Championships by current conference membership

Championships by state/jurisdiction

See also
NCAA Division I men's basketball tournament records
Helms Athletic Foundation national champions
Mythical national championships in college basketball

Notes
The result was later stricken from the NCAA record books after it was discovered that the team had committed a rules violation.
Oklahoma A&M changed its name to Oklahoma State in 1957.
Louisville won the 2013 national championship game, but the NCAA vacated the title in 2018.
The championship game was scheduled to be held in Atlanta, Georgia, but the tournament was cancelled due to the COVID-19 pandemic in the United States.

References
General

Specific

NCAA
Champions
Champions